Parliamentary elections were held in the SR Slovenia on 8 April 1990, together with the first round of presidential elections. 

They were the first direct elections held in Slovenia since World War II, and the first relatively free elections held there since 1925. It was actually a transitional election leading to the country's first fully democratic election on 6 December 1992, by which time Slovenia had already gained its independence.

80 delegates were elected to the Sociopolitical Chamber and 80 delegates to the Chamber of Communes of the Assembly of the Socialist Republic of Slovenia. 

On 12 April 1990, 80 delegates to the Chamber of Associated Labour were elected. More than 55% of the vote for the Sociopolitical Chamber went to the DEMOS coalition, formed by newly established parties of the Slovenian Spring. The United List of Social Democrats emerged as the largest party in the Sociopolitical Chamber, winning 14 seats.

In total 1,490,136 people had the right to vote and 1,241,212 of them (83.3%) participated, of which only 1,238,189 people actually cast their ballots.

Results

Socio-Political Chamber

Chamber of Associated Labour

Chamber of Communes

References

Slovenia
Parliamentary
Parliamentary elections in Slovenia
Slovenian Spring
Slovenia
Election and referendum articles with incomplete results